The Sayabec River is a fresh stream flowing through the municipality of Sayabec, in the La Matapédia Regional County Municipality (MRC), in the region of Bas-Saint-Laurent.

Toponymy 
The toponym “Sayabec River” was formalized on 5 December 1968 at the Commission de toponymie du Québec.

See also 

 List of rivers of Quebec

References

External links 
 Watershed organization of the Matapedia river
 Corporation de Gestion des Rivières Matapédia et Patapédia

La Matapédia Regional County Municipality
Rivers of Bas-Saint-Laurent